Paranoid Delusions/Paradise Illusions is the third studio album by the American rock band Pulling Teeth. The album was released on March 31, 2009 through Deathwish Inc. The cover art for the vinyl edition of Paranoid Delusions/Paradise Illusions features a lenticular image that shifts from "a serene, forested landscape populated solely by a languishing maiden" to a "nightmarish, zombiefied nuclear scenario," Jay DiNitto of Noisecreep said.

Track listing
 "Ritual" – 4:42
 "Unsatisfied" – 2:36
 "Bloodwolves" – 2:51
 "Paranoid Delusions" – 3:55
 "Paradise Illusions" – 9:26

References

Deathwish Inc. albums
Pulling Teeth (band) albums
2009 albums